John Holles, 1st Earl of Clare (May 1564 – 4 October 1637) was an English nobleman.

He was the son of Denzil Holles of Irby upon Humber and Eleanor Sheffield (daughter of Edmund Sheffield, 1st Baron Sheffield of Butterwick). His great-grandfather was William Hollyes, Lord Mayor of London. He was born at Haughton Hall, Nottinghamshire and educated at Christ's College, Cambridge from 1579, aged 12, after which he studied law at Gray's Inn from 1583. He was at Court until 1599.

Holles married Anne Stanhope (daughter of Sir Thomas Stanhope) on 23 May 1591 in Shelford, Nottinghamshire. Through his marriage to Anne, he inherited Thurland Hall in Nottingham which was later known as Clare Place. The family seat was at Haughton Hall in the parish of Bothamsall, which was demolished in the late eighteenth century. He served as High Sheriff of Nottinghamshire for 1591–92.

He was comptroller of the household of Prince Henry until the prince's death on 6 November 1612.

He was Member of Parliament for Nottinghamshire from 1604 to 1611 and from 1614 to 1616. He was created 1st Baron Haughton on 9 July 1616 and 1st Earl of Clare on 2 November 1624.

He died at home in Nottingham and is buried in St. Mary's Church, Nottingham. He had 6 sons and 4 daughters.

Student of Architecture
Around 1604, he mentioned in a letter to the Earl of Northumberland that he was returning the earl's architecture books, including works by Vitruvius, Vignola and Guigati, which were required by Sir Edward Francis. 

Northumberland had sent him other volumes by Jacques I Androuet du Cerceau, Philibert de l'Orme, Sebastiano Serlio, Wendel Dietterlin, and Leon Battista Alberti, and he knew that Holles had his own copy of the works of Palladio.

Children
 John Holles, 2nd Earl of Clare (1595–1666), married Elizabeth Vere. MP for East Retford
 Denzil Holles, 1st Baron Holles (1599–1680) MP for Mitchell
 Francis (1604–1622)
 Eleanore Holles, married Oliver Fitzwilliam, 1st Earl of Tyrconnel, became Countess of Tyrconnel, buried in St. Mary's Church, Nottingham 11 April 1681
 Arabella Holles (1594–1631), married Thomas Wentworth, 1st Earl of Strafford

Ancestry

References

|-

External links
 
 
 

1564 births
1637 deaths
Alumni of Christ's College, Cambridge
Members of Gray's Inn
16th-century English nobility
English MPs 1604–1611
English MPs 1614
High Sheriffs of Nottinghamshire
Earls of Clare
Politicians from Nottingham
17th-century English nobility